Kisecik is a small belde (town) in the central district (Karaman) of Karaman Province, Turkey. The population of the town is 759 as of 2011  The name of the town means " poor" in older Turkish, because the earliest inhabitants were nomads. The town was founded as a result of an operation of the Ottoman Empire government to settle the nomadic tribes in 1887. The government settled the Turkmen  tribe named Sarıkeçili in the Kisecik. In 1991 the settlement was declared a seat of township. The main crops of the town are cereals, legume and sugarbeet.

Future

According to Sustainable development report prepared by the Ministry of Environment and Forestry (Turkey) the projected population of Kisecik in 2025 is 4000. The present master plan  of the town is found to be sufficient for the future expansion.

References 

Populated places in Karaman Province
Towns in Turkey
Karaman Central District